This is a list of notable press release agencies. A press release is a written or recorded communication directed at members of the news media for the purpose of announcing something ostensibly newsworthy. Public relations is the practice of managing the spread of information between an individual or an organization (such as a business, government agency, or a nonprofit organization) and the public.

Press release agencies

 Business Wire – an international press release agency. Founded in 1961. It is a subsidiary of Berkshire Hathaway.
 CNW Group – formerly a Canadian-based commercial press release service that had bureaus in Toronto, Montreal (as CNW Telbec), Calgary and Vancouver, has been absorbed by Cision.
 GlobeNewswire – an American press release distribution company, headquartered in Los Angeles, California. An Intrado subsidiary since 2018, it is a newswire distribution network.
 PR Newswire – a distributor of press releases based in New York City. The service was created in 1954 to allow companies to electronically send press releases to news organizations, at first using teleprinters. PR Newswire was acquired by Cision in 2016.
 Sovfoto – established in 1932 as the only agency to represent Soviet photojournalism in America. It continues today as a commercial entity Sovfoto/Eastfoto. Collections from its archive are held also at MacLaren Art Centre in Barrie, Canada which in 2001 was donated 23,116 vintage gelatin silver prints dating from 1936 to 1957, while Amhurst University holds the Tass Sovfoto Photograph Collection, 1919–1963, the majority being from 1943–1963.
 Talk to the Press – a press and publicity agency that was founded in 2007 by media expert and former national newspaper journalist Natasha Courtenay-Smith.
 U.S. Newswire – a U.S. national news release wire service established in 1986 and distributes media materials on behalf of a variety of customers, particularly the U.S. government and non-profit agencies. It is based in Washington DC and was acquired from Medialink by PR Newswire on October 1, 2006.

See also

 Brand management
 Digital marketing
 List of news agencies
 List of public relations journals
 List of wire services
 Litigation public relations
 News agency
 Press agent
 Press service
 Publicist

References

 
Lists of service companies
Photo agencies